is a Japanese light novel series written by Yomu Mishima and illustrated by Monda. It was originally self-published as a web novel on the Shōsetsuka ni Narō platform by the author beginning on October 1, 2017, and ending on October 15, 2019, concluding with seven parts and 176 chapters. It later began publishing as a light novel by Micro Magazine under their GC Novels imprint on May 30, 2018. A manga adaptation of the series by Jun Shiosato began serialization on October 5, 2018, and is published under the Dragon Comics Age imprint by Fujimi Shobo. Seven Seas Entertainment publishes both the light novel and the manga adaptation in English. An anime television series adaptation by ENGI aired from April to June 2022. A second season has been announced.

Plot
An office worker dies and finds himself reincarnated as Leon Fou Bartfort in the Holfort Kingdom of the otome game that he was forced to complete by his sister. In this world, women reign supreme, and survival is particularly tough for 'mobs', background characters like him. Using his encyclopedic knowledge of the game from his past life, Leon sets on disrupting this world and its social hierarchy by finding the cheat item Luxion and enrolling in the Holtfort Academy. He attempts to live a normal life and find a wife, but through his actions he gets embroiled in all kinds of schemes, all while mingling with the nobility and other characters of the otome game.

Characters

The protagonist of the series. After he died, he reincarnated in the otome game world; he is thoroughly aggravated by this, as it was the game his sister blackmailed him into completing. He has black hair, eyes, and an average look, having plain features that let him blend into the background. Despite looking down on overly prideful people, Leon himself enjoys showing arrogance in his abilities, namely as a tactic to damage his opponent's confidence and pride through shows of superiority. Although he tries to stay out of trouble and not interfere with the story of the otome world, he often drags himself to the center of these events for those he cares for. 

The protagonist of the first otome game, whom Leon befriends. She has light brown hair with greenish-blue eyes. She is a modest girl who is very kind and gentle with people, but lacks self-confidence. This stems from how she is a commoner who attends a school that is dominantly populated by nobles who look down on her. Unlike the main storyline, Olivia is actually happily in love with Leon; as in the game routes, she couldn't refuse the advances of the captured characters out of societal standing. She and Angelica eventually get engaged to Leon. Had she gone through the game plot, Olivia would have been possessed by an evil ghost; she owes Marie for taking her spot as heroine and making Leon help Olivia.

The main villainess of the first otome game, whom Leon befriends. She has blond hair with fierce red eyes. Thanks to Marie's meddling, Angelica instead becomes the victim of what should have been Olivia's story. Instead, she becomes best friends with Olivia and engaged to Leon. After all the pressure she put on herself to be Julius' queen, Angie is happy to be with Leon as he has no high expectations of her (primarily because he hates noble ranking).

An artificial intelligence item with a personality of its own, Luxion assists Leon with his activities. Its main body is a giant black spaceship-like airship but to get around, Luxion takes on the appearance of a small metal ball with a single red lens. Since Leon is technically a New Human, Luxion sometimes messes up his orders as it hates new humans, although it can be loyal to Leon anytime because the latter has a bloodline of the Old Human, a human race who is reincarnated from their previous life on parallel Earth.

The daughter of a Viscount family. She's petite, being short with a small chest and slim body, with long blonde hair that frames her face and sky blue eyes. She comes off as a kind and shy young girl, but reality, she is selfish and manipulative, with having no problem with manipulating others for her own gain. She is also Leon's sister from his last life; she feels deeply sorry that she pushed him to play the game causing his death, which started a chain of events that lead to a bad life. Marie did leave a positive legacy, with her daughter; said daughter later reincarnated as Erica, the sister of Julius (one of the game's capture targets). After reuniting with her brother, Marie eventually reconnected with her daughter, finally earning some happiness.

One of the main capture target in the first series of the otome game and the crown prince of the Holfort Kingdom. He's considered an idiot and hypocritical by both Marie and Leon, and even his own mother Mylene; considering he ignored Angelica's sound advice. The humiliation conga is only worse by the fact his sister is Marie's daughter from her past life reincarnated; meaning he is stuck with Leon's family one way or another.

One of the capture targets. A green-haired young man who is fanatically loyal to Julius and acts as his right-hand man. While he likes to play the part of loyal subordinate and gentlemen, he is actually quite devious. He will not hesitate to use under-handed or dishonest means to achieve victory, such as when he convinced Leon's sister to plant explosives on Leon's mech during the arena battle. 

Brad is a purple haired young man who is one of the five capture targets. He is considered the weakest physically among his peers, though his magical abilities are slightly above average. He is knocked out with a single blow from Leon during the mech battle. 

One of the five capture targets. He has short, light blue hair and glasses, and is considered a master of swordsmanship, owing to a high degree of training and hard work. While he represents the "smart guy" trope, he is actually just as arrogant and smug as his associates, and is easily defeated by Leon.

Greg is a meat-heated member of the five main capture targets, who represents the "dumb jock" of the group. While physically strong and skilled in combat, he uses mass-produced arms and armor to show off his personal prowess. Arrogant and bull-headed, he will often charge into battle stupidly without any strategy, such as when he tried to attack Leon's mech suit Arroganz with a piece of metal in his bare hands.

The Queen of Holfort Kingdom. She is the wife of Roland and the mother of Julius Rapha Holfort and Erica Rapha Holfort, whom Leon took an interest on her. As she is in a loveless marriage, Mylene was easily wooed by Leon's genuine affection for her.

The protagonist of the second otome game. She's the first daughter and once former of the Lespinasse Household and a second-year high school student at Commonwealth Academy. She is the eldest twin sister of Leila. She becomes Leon's third fiancee.

She is the youngest daughter of the Beltre Household and once former of the Lespinasse Household. She is the younger twin sister of Noelle. Like Leon and Marie, she is also revealed to be originally an Old Human.

The eldest daughter of the Rault Household and a third-year high school student at the Alzer Academy, a senior of Leon.

The main villainess of the third otome game. She's the youngest child and a crown princess of the Rapha Holfort Household and a second-year high school student at Commonwealth Academy. In reality, she is in fact Marie's daughter and Leon's niece. Back in her previous life, following her mother's expulsion from the family for the role of Leon's death and her selfish life, then followed by her tragic fate after being abandoned by her ex-husband, Erica's former father, Erica herself lived a happy and humbled life with her grandparents and grows mature and wise while still missed her mother. By the time she died at 60, she reincarnate into otome world where her former uncle and mother are reincarnated there too. Originally, Erica's character was meant to be a very cruel war-mongering princess, particularly towards Hertrauda before being condemned for her crimes. By the time she reincarnated as Erica and is immediately aware of the current situation in the new world she is now living in, the villainous role of the original Erica does not come to pass, and the said reincarnator who became Erica prefers to observe her allies and reincarnated former family members from the sidelines with a stable position that did not harm her nor the otome world itself, unlike Marie and Leila. Erica and Marie resume their previous mother-daughter relationship; both happy to be reunited.

The final boss of the third otome game.

The older sister of Hetrauda.

Media

Light novel
The light novel is written by Yomu Mishima and illustrated by Monda. Micro Magazine has published eleven volumes under their GC Novels imprint since May 30, 2018. It was originally self-published by the author as a web novel. Seven Seas Entertainment licensed the series in English in April 2020 and the first volume was released digitally on November 19, 2020.

Other languages
The light novel series is also published in:
 Korea as 여성향 게임 세계는 모브에게가혹한 세계입니다 under the label S Novel Plus by Somy Media, who began publishing on March 13, 2020.
 Taiwan as 輕小說 女性向遊戲世界對路人角色很不友好 by Chingwin Publishing Group beginning on December 17, 2020.
 Thailand as ชีวิตตัวประกอบอย่างตูช่างอยู่ยากเมื่ออยู่ในโลกเกมจีบหนุ่ม under Luckpim Publishing beginning on October 16, 2019.
 Vietnam as Thế Giới Otomegame Thật Khắc Nghiệt Với Nhân Vật Quần Chúng by Tsuki LightNovel beginning in August 2020.

Manga
A manga adaptation by Jun Shiosato began serialization on October 5, 2018 and is published under the Dragon Comics Age imprint by Fujimi Shobo. The manga moved from the Dra Dra Sharp online manga website to the Monthly Dragon Age magazine on January 8, 2022. Seven Seas Entertainment announced their licensing of the manga adaptation on December 4, 2020 and published the first volume in July 2021. It has been collected in nine tankōbon volumes.

A spin-off manga illustrated by Noko Ōmi, titled Otome Game Yōchien wa Mob ni Kibishii Yōchien Desu, began serialization in Monthly Dragon Age on June 6, 2022.

Other languages
The manga is also published in:
 Korea as 여성향 게임 세계는 엑스트라에게 엄격한 세계입니다 under Shift Comics by YNK Publishing, beginning on February 13, 2020.
 Taiwan as 女性向遊戲世界對路人角色很不友好 under Chingwin Publishing Group beginning on December 17, 2020.
 Thailand as ชีวิตตัวประกอบอย่างตูช่างอยู่ยากเมื่ออยู่ในโลกเกมจีบหนุ่ม under Luckpim Publishing beginning on August 5, 2019.

Anime
An anime television series adaptation was announced on November 25, 2021. It is produced by ENGI and directed by Kazuya Miura and Shin'ichi Fukumoto, with Kenta Ihara writing the scripts, Masahiko Suzuki designing the characters, and Kana Hashiguchi and Show Aratame composing the music. The series aired from April 3 to June 19, 2022, on AT-X, Tokyo MX, ytv, and BS NTV. The opening theme song is "Silent Minority" by Kashitarō Itō, while the ending theme song is "selfish" by Riko Azuna. Crunchyroll has licensed the series. On April 11, 2022, Crunchyroll announced that the series will receive an English dub, which premiered on April 17.

A second season was announced on December 26, 2022.

Episode list

Reception
The light novel series has sold at least 760,000 copies in total as of June 17, 2021.

Notes

References

External links
  at Shōsetsuka ni Narō 
  
  
  
  at Seven Seas Entertainment 
 

2018 Japanese novels
2022 anime television series debuts
Anime and manga based on light novels
Comedy anime and manga
Crunchyroll anime
ENGI
Fiction about reincarnation
Fujimi Shobo manga
Isekai anime and manga
Isekai novels and light novels
Japanese webcomics
Light novels
Light novels first published online
Science fiction anime and manga
Seven Seas Entertainment titles
Shōnen manga
Shōsetsuka ni Narō
Upcoming anime television series
Webcomics in print